Lygaeus turcicus, the false milkweed bug, is a species of seed bug in the family Lygaeidae. It is found in Eastern North America.

Description
The false milkweed bug is widely distributed across the eastern United States and Canada. It primarily feeds on the seeds of false sunflower, Heliopsis helianthoides. The false milkweed bug is commonly confused with other black and red or orange insects, including Oncopeltus fasciatus, Lygaeus kalmii, and Lygaeus reclivatus.

References

Further reading

External links

 

Lygaeidae
Articles created by Qbugbot
Insects described in 1803